Clavero is a surname. Notable people with the surname include:

Bartolomé Clavero, Spanish jurist and legal historian
Daniel Clavero (born 1968), Spanish racing cyclist
Manuel Clavero (1926–2021), Spanish lawyer and politician
Rafael Clavero (born 1977), Spanish footballer